Skathi , also named Saturn XXVII and originally spelled Skadi, is a natural satellite of the planet Saturn. Skathi is one of Saturn's irregular moons, in its Norse group of satellites. It was discovered on September 23, 2000, by a team of astronomers led by Brett Gladman. The team announced their discovery on December 7, 2000, along with seven other satellites of Saturn, namely; Tarvos, Ijiraq, Thrymr, Siarnaq, Mundilfari, Erriapus, and Suttungr. The moon was named after Skaði, a figure in Norse mythology, as part of an effort to diversify the largely Greek and Roman names of astronomical objects.

Skathi takes just over 725 days to complete an orbit of Saturn and it is estimated to take  hours to rotate on its axis. It orbits at a greater distance from Saturn than many of the planet's other satellites, with a large orbital inclination and eccentricity, and it moves in a retrograde direction. Not much is known about Skathi, because it is a dim object.

Skathi's origin remains an open question. One possibility is that it was originally an asteroid that formed elsewhere, and was captured by Saturn's gravity as it flew by the planet. Another possibility is that it was originally a portion of one of Saturn's moons, like Phoebe, that split off during a collision and became an independent satellite.

Discovery

Skathi was discovered on September 23, 2000, by Brett J. Gladman, John J. Kavelaars, Jean-Marc Petit, Hans Scholl, Matthew J. Holman, Brian G. Marsden, Phil Nicholson, and Joseph A. Burns. The team used images taken by the Canada–France–Hawaii Telescope at the Mauna Kea Observatories.

At first, Skathi was given the temporary name "S/2000 S 8": the first "S" denotes that Skathi is a satellite (as opposed to, say, a planetary ring), "2000" specifies that it was discovered in the year 2000, the second "S" is assigned because it orbits the planet Saturn, and the number 8 means that it was the eighth such object discovered in that year.

Skathi's name was specifically chosen to diversify the origins of names given to astronomical objects. Most English names for planets are derived from the Roman names for planets, and scientists who have named satellites have tended to follow this pattern. Given this context, the historian Jürgen Blunck wrote that Kavelaars "attempted to help astronomical nomenclature to find its way out of its Greco-Romano-Renaissance rut", attempting to assign the newly discovered satellites names "that were both multicultural and Canadian". For Skathi he selected a name from Norse mythology, in which Skaði is a giantess who traveled to Asgard to avenge the death of her father. Several of Saturn's other satellites (Ijiraq, Kiviuq, Paaliaq, Siarnaq, and Tarqeq) were given names from Inuit mythology.

When the name of the moon was announced in 2003, it was given as "Skadi", using  as a graphical approximation of the Icelandic letter  (eth). In 2005, the IAU Working Group on Planetary System Nomenclature instead decided to use the transliteration .

When Skathi was given its permanent name, it was also assigned the Roman numeral designation Saturn XXVII.

Motion

All of the members of Saturn's Norse group of satellites, which includes Skathi, share roughly the same orbital characteristics. Skathi has a retrograde orbit, meaning that it orbits in the opposite direction as Saturn's orbit. An orbital period of just over two years is fast for an irregular satellite of Saturn, and Skathi completes an orbit faster than any other known retrograde moon of Saturn except Phoebe. Its orbital inclination, which represents how slanted its orbit is compared to the plane on which most objects orbit the sun, is 149° compared to the ecliptic and 150° compared to Saturn's equator. This means that it orbits at a sharp angle compared to most objects in the Solar System. Skathi also has an orbital eccentricity of 0.246. A circular orbit has a value of zero; Skathi's orbit is more elliptical than the orbit of many objects in the Solar System, such as the Earth's, which has an eccentricity of 0.016.

In some ways Skathi's orbit is typical of Saturn's irregular moons, but its orbit differs in some important ways from all of the other objects in this group: for instance, its orbit is unusually fast for an irregular satellite of Saturn, and has a smaller semi-major axis than all of Saturn's other retrograde moons except Phoebe.

Skathi's rotation period was initially estimated to be between 11 and 12 hours. As of 2019, the most precise measurements were those taken by the Cassini probe, which identified the time taken for Skathi to revolve around its axis of rotation at  hours.

Physical characteristics

Skathi was first identified by Earth-based observations, and much of the information about Skathi's features and composition comes from observations taken from the Earth. The Cassini probe also observed Skathi on eight occasions between March 2011 and August 2016.

It has an apparent optical magnitude of 23.6 from Earth, and an absolute visual magnitude of about 14, so it is much less bright from Earth than many hundreds of thousands of objects outside the Solar System. From Earth it appears close to the much brighter object that it orbits, Saturn, and is assumed to have a low surface albedo of about 0.06.

The amount of light that Skathi reflects varies substantially as it rotates, which implies that it is an irregularly shaped object. Its spectral slope of +5.2%/100 nm indicates a reddish surface, similar to the Gallic group moons Erriapus and Tarvos.

Many of Saturn's moons are composed of water ice and rock, but Skathi's chemical composition has not been determined, and it may have different physical composition than Saturn's other moons (particularly because it may not have originated in the vicinity of Saturn). The density of Skathi is also not known, but Saturnian irregular satellites are typically not dense, below 1 gram per cubic centimetre, and low densities are thought to characterize most of these objects.

Origin
There has been active debate on the origin of Skathi and Saturn's other irregular satellites, prompted by how different their orbits are compared to other satellites of Saturn and of the sun. The planets and satellites of a planetary system are thought to usually form by accreting together out of objects in a protoplanetary disk. Because the particles in any part of a protoplanetary disk usually move in similar directions and at similar speeds, a moon that formed from a merger of these particles should have a fairly circular, prograde orbit, approximately on the plane of the protoplanetary disk. But Skathi's irregular orbit, like the other natural satellites of Saturn that share similarly irregular orbits, has prompted alternative speculations about its origin.

One possibility is that Skathi originally formed somewhere other than in the vicinity of Saturn, and then began to travel through space before being captured by the planet. However, it is also possible that Skathi is a piece of debris that was knocked off of one of Saturn's other moons, during a collision with another object. Because orbits can be extremely chaotic and sensitive to initial conditions, it is possible that some types of collisions could produce an extremely irregular orbit like Skathi's, although these orbits are usually not stable over very long timescales.

See also
Saturn's Norse group of satellites
 Stats of planets in the Solar System

Notes

References

Norse group
Moons of Saturn
Irregular satellites
Discoveries by Brett J. Gladman
Astronomical objects discovered in 2000
Moons with a retrograde orbit